This is a list of VTV dramas released in 2010.

←2009 - 2010 - 2011→

VTV Tet dramas

VTV1
These dramas air on VTV1 during the period of Tet.

VTV3
These dramas air on VTV3 during the period of Tet.

VTV1 Weeknight Prime-time dramas

Monday-Wednesday dramas
These dramas air from 20h10 to 21h, Monday to Wednesday on VTV1.

Thursday-Friday dramas
These dramas air from 20h10 to 21h, Thursday and Friday on VTV1.

VTV3 Weeknight Prime-time dramas

Monday-Wednesday dramas
These dramas air from 21h10 to 22h, Monday to Wednesday on VTV3.

Thursday-Saturday dramas
These dramas air from 21h10 to 22h, Thursday to Saturday on VTV3.
Note: After Chít và Pi, no more dramas aired on Saturday. The time slot was followed by several episodes of Vệt nắng cuối trời & Phía cuối cầu vồng (originally air on Monday to Wednesday time slot), then new drama Cho một tình yêu.

VTV3 Rubic 8 dramas
These dramas air from 14h30 to 15h15, Saturday and Sunday on VTV3 as a part of the program Rubic 8.

See also
 List of dramas broadcast by Vietnam Television (VTV)
 List of dramas broadcast by Hanoi Radio Television (HanoiTV)
 List of dramas broadcast by Vietnam Digital Television (VTC)

References

External links
VTV.gov.vn – Official VTV Website 
VTV.vn – Official VTV Online Newspaper 

Vietnam Television original programming
2010 in Vietnamese television